2012–13 Nemzeti Bajnokság I (men's handball) season.

Team information

Regular season

Standings

Pld - Played; W - Won; L - Lost; PF - Points for; PA - Points against; Diff - Difference; Pts - Points.

Relegation round

References

External links
Scoresway

Nemzeti Bajnokság I (men's handball)
2012–13 domestic handball leagues
Nemzeti Bajnoksag I Men